Nachtjagdgeschwader 3 (NJG 3) was a Luftwaffe night fighter-wing of World War II. NJG 3 was formed on 29 September 1941 in Stade from Stab./Zerstörergeschwader 26.

Commanding officers

Geschwaderkommodore
Major Johann Schalk, 29 March 1941 – 1 August 1943
Oberst Helmut Lent, 1 August 1943 – 7 October 1944
Oberst Günther Radusch, 12 November 1944 – 8 May 1945

Gruppenkommandeur

I. Gruppe
 Hauptmann Günther Radusch, 7 October 1940 – 2 October 1941
 Hauptmann Hans-Dietrich Knoetzsch, 3 October 1941 – 30 September 1942
 Major Egmont Prinz zur Lippe-Weißenfeld, 1 October 1942 – 31 May 1943
 Hauptmann Erhard Peters, 1 June 1943 – 14 August 1943
 Hauptmann Walter Mylius, 15 August 1943 – 13 December 1943
 Hauptmann Paul Szameitat, 14 December 1943 – 2 January 1944
 Major Werner Husemann, 4 January 1944 – 8 May 1945

II. Gruppe
 Hauptmann Günther Radusch, 3 October 1941 – 1 August 1943
 Major Heinrich Prinz zu Sayn-Wittgenstein, 15 August 1943 – November 1943
 Hauptmann Paul Szameitat, December 1943 – 14 December 1943
 Major Klaus Havenstein, 15 December 1943 – September 1944
 Hauptmann Hüschens, September 1944 – February 1945

III. Gruppe
 Oberstleutnant Heinz Nacke, 1 November 1941 – 21 April 1943
 Hauptmann Walter Mylius, 22 April 1943 – 14 August 1943
 Hauptmann Rudolf Sigmund, 15 August 1943 – 4 October 1943
 Major Walter Barthe, 15 October 1943 – 8 May 1945

IV. Gruppe
 Major Erich Simon, 1 November 1942 – 7 October 1943
 Hauptmann Albert Schulz, 8 October 1943 – January 1944
 Hauptmann Franz Buschmann, January 1944 – July 1944
 Hauptmann Heinz Ferger, July 1944 – November 1944
 Major Berthold Ney, November 1944 – 4 March 1945
 Hauptmann Freidrich Tober, 5 March 1945 – 8 May 1945

Surviving aircraft

Two aircraft that served with NJG 3 are displayed together at the Royal Air Force Museum London, one of the two sites of the Royal Air Force Museum. These are Messerschmitt Bf 110 G Werk Nr. 730301, which was surrendered to the British at the end of the war in 1945, and Junkers Ju 88 R-1, Werk Nr. 360043, which came into British hands in 1943. Both aircraft are almost unique - each is one of only two intact survivors of their type.

References

Bibliography

 
 
 
 
 
 
 
 
 
 
 
 
 
 
 
 
 
 
 
 
 
 
 
 
 
 
 
 
 
 
 
 
 
 
 
 
 

Nachtjagdgeschwader 003
Military units and formations established in 1941